A nail stylist is a person whose occupation is to style and shape a person's nails. This is achieved using a combination of decorating nails with coloured varnish, transfers, gems or glitter.
Basic treatments include manicures and pedicures, as well as cleaning and filing nails and applying  overlays or extensions.

Using a stencil or stamping, nail stylists can also paint designs onto nails with an airbrush, by hand. A nail stylist will often complete a consultation with the client to check for any signs of skin problems, deformities or nail disease before treatment, advise clients about looking after their hands and nails, and recommend nail care products.

Training to become a nail stylist involves completing a professional course that normally takes at least a year. Courses will more than likely cover anatomy and physiology of the nails, hands, arms, feet and legs, contraindications that may arise, identifying diseases and disorders, proper sanitation and sterilizing techniques, how to perform nail services safely, gel polish application, liquid and powder enhancements and hard gel enhancements. The work itself tends to take place in a beauty salon although some nail stylists will make house calls to clients. Once licensed, many nail stylists will keep their own regular client list. The basic equipment needed to carry out Nail services can be easily obtained. Types of basic equipment can include nail drills, brushes, gel polish, and a UV lamp. Specialist equipment will be needed for specific nail applications.

References

Beauty